This is a list of the municipalities in the state of Pernambuco (PE), located in the Northeast Region of Brazil. Pernambuco is divided into 184 municipalities (plus the state district of Fernando de Noronha), which are grouped into 19 microregions, which are grouped into 5 mesoregions.

See also
Geography of Brazil
List of cities in Brazil

Pernambuco